Rubén Fernando Velázquez López (born 4 February 1953) is a Mexican politician affiliated with the PRD. As of 2013 he served as Senator of the LX and LXI Legislatures of the Mexican Congress representing Chiapas.

References

1953 births
Living people
People from Tuxtla Gutiérrez
Members of the Senate of the Republic (Mexico)
Party of the Democratic Revolution politicians
21st-century Mexican politicians